National Velvet is an American drama series that originally aired from 1960 to 1962 on NBC. Based on the 1935 novel and 1944 film of the same name, the series ran for a total of fifty-eight episodes.

Synopsis
National Velvet stars Lori Martin as Velvet Brown, a girl who lives on a dairy farm with her parents, Martha (Ann Doran) and Herbert Brown (Arthur Space), an ex-jockey Mi Taylor, played by Scottish actor James McCallion (1918-1991), her brother, Donald (Joey Scott), and sister, Edwina (Carole Wells). Velvet owned a thoroughbred stallion named King which she hoped would one day run in the Grand National Steeplechase.

Cast
Lori Martin as Velvet Brown
Arthur Space as Herbert Brown
Carole Wells as Edwina Brown
Joey Scott as Donald Brown
Ann Doran as Martha Brown
James McCallion as Mi Taylor

Episodes

Season 1 (1960–61)

Season 2 (1961–62)

Guest stars

Parley Baer
Roy Barcroft
Beau Bridges
Edgar Buchanan
James T. Callahan
Robert L. Crawford, Jr.
Audrey Dalton
Richard Deacon
Don Dubbins
Jack Elam
Ross Elliott
Frank Ferguson
Joan Freeman
Darlene Gillespie
Harold Gould
Susan Seaforth Hayes

Ricky Kelman
Sheila James Kuehl
Harry Lauter
Betty Lynn
Nora Marlowe
Tyler McVey
Roger Mobley
Bill Mumy
J. Pat O'Malley
Emory Parnell
Denver Pyle
Stuart Randall
Addison Richards
Hal J. Smith 
Rusty Stevens

Production notes
First aired at 8 p.m. Eastern on Sunday preceding The Tab Hunter Show and opposite CBS's The Ed Sullivan Show. National Velvet was switched for its second season to 8 p.m. Monday opposite CBS's sitcom Pete and Gladys, starring Harry Morgan and Cara Williams, and the last half of ABC's Cheyenne western series starring Clint Walker.

References

External links
 

1960 American television series debuts
1962 American television series endings
1960s American drama television series
Black-and-white American television shows
English-language television shows
NBC original programming
Live action television shows based on films
Television shows based on British novels
Television series by MGM Television
Television series based on adaptations